The blue eared pheasant (Crossoptilon auritum) is a large, up to  long, dark blue-gray pheasant with velvet black crown, red facial feathers appearing as bare skin, yellow iris, long white ear coverts behind the eyes, and crimson legs. Its tail of 24 elongated bluish-gray feathers is curved, loose, and dark-tipped. Both sexes are similar with the male being slightly larger.

The blue eared pheasant is found throughout mountain forests of central China. Its diet consists mainly of berries and vegetable matter.

One of the most common and numerous eared pheasants, the blue eared pheasant is evaluated as of least concern on the IUCN Red List of Threatened Species.

See also
List of endangered and protected species of China

References

External links
 BirdLife Species Factsheet

blue eared pheasant
Birds of North China
Birds of Central China
Endemic birds of China
blue eared pheasant